Buena Vista Pumping Plant is a water pumping plant of the California State Water Project, located 22 miles (36 km) southwest of Bakersfield, within Kern County, in the San Joaquin Valley, central California. 

The plant is the third pumping plant for the California Aqueduct.

External links
 

California State Water Project
Water supply infrastructure in California
Water supply pumping stations in the United States
Buildings and structures in Kern County, California